The 2011 Scottish League Cup final was the final match of the 2010–11 Scottish League Cup, the 65th season of the Scottish League Cup. It was played by Old Firm rivals Celtic and Rangers. Rangers won the trophy after extra time 2–1.

Route to the final

Celtic

As Celtic had been competing in Europe, they entered the competition in the third round. They began their campaign against Inverness Caledonian Thistle and they beat Caley 6–0, thanks to goals from Georgios Samaras (3), Gary Hooper and Anthony Stokes (2). Celtic then traveled to Perth, where they played St Johnstone. Two goals by Stokes and one from Niall McGinn gave The Bhoys a comfortable 3–0 lead. The Saints later came back into the game with goals from Sam Parkin and Murray Davidson, but Celtic held on to win 3–2. In the semi-final, Celtic played Aberdeen, who had been beaten earlier in the season by Celtic 9–0 and 1–0. Celtic scored four goals in 34 minutes (Kris Commons, Charlie Mulgrew, Thomas Rogne and Anthony Stokes) and eventually won 4–1.

This League Cup final was the 28th in Celtic's history. They have won 14 of them, the last in 2009, which means Celtic are the second-most successful team in the history of the tournament.

Rangers

As Rangers also had been competing in Europe, they entered the competition in the third round. They began their campaign at home against First Division side Dunfermline Athletic and beat The Pars 7–2, thanks to goals from Nikica Jelavic (2) Kyle Lafferty (3), Madjid Bougherra and Steven Naismith. In the next round Rangers travelled to Rugby Park, where they played Kilmarnock in an all-SPL cup tie. The Gers won 2–0 thanks to goals from Andrew Little and Naismith. In the semi-final, Rangers played Motherwell, who had been beaten earlier by Rangers twice in the league 4–1. Rangers scored first, but Maurice Edu's strike was cancelled out by a Keith Lasley second half goal. Rangers then scored again, thanks to Naismith's third goal in this season's competition and Walter Smith's men triumphed 2–1.

This League Cup final was the 34th in Rangers' history. They have won 27 of them, which means Rangers are the most successful team in the history of the tournament.

Match details

Statistics

Media coverage
In the UK, the final was broadcast live on BBC One Scotland on their Sportscene programme with build-up starting at 14:30 UTC.

Commentary of the match on radio was from BBC Radio Scotland, BBC Radio nan Gàidheal and BBC Radio 5 Live Sports Extra.

In Ireland the 2011 Scottish League Cup final was broadcast live on Setanta Ireland.

References

2011
Scottish League Cup Final 2011
Scottish League Cup Final 2011
Final
Final
2010s in Glasgow
Old Firm matches